In military tactics, a camisado or camisade is a surprise attack occurring at night or at daybreak, when the enemy are supposed to be asleep.

The term comes from Spanish camisa (shirt): when the Tercio had actions (skirmishes) of around fifty men attacking at night with minimum equipment, only sword and dagger (although some soldiers could carry arquebus or musket), and they were dressed only with a white shirt (thus the Spanish word :es:encamisada), in order to kill in silence as many enemies as possible while they were sleeping. This is reflected in the film Alatriste, based on the main character of The Adventures of Captain Alatriste, a series of novels written by Arturo Pérez-Reverte.'Notable camisados
 On 16 December 1332, Scots forces successfully led a surprise attacked in the early morning hours against King Edward Balliol and his supporters at the Battle of Annan. 
 On 9 October 1544, French forces under the Dauphin assaulted Boulogne by night, but were ultimately unsuccessful.
 On 14 October 1758, General Daun surprised Frederick the Great in the Battle of Hochkirch.
 On 26 December 1776, General George Washington and his Continental Army swiftly defeated the Hessians in the Battle of Trenton.
 Camisado is a song from Panic! At The Disco's debut album A Fever You Can't Sweat Out''.

Quotations

  (Spanish) Chapter of "la encamisada" in "El sol de Breda"

References

External links

Assault tactics